Hanno Pevkur (born 2 April 1977) is an Estonian politician who is currently the Minister of Defence. He is the former chairman of the Estonian Reform Party.

He has served as the Minister of Social Affairs from 2009 to 2012, as the Minister of Justice from 2012 to 2014 and as the Minister of the Interior from 2014 to 2016.

Early life
Pevkur graduated from Järva-Jaani Secondary School and studied law at the Tallinn School of Economics, and at the University of Tartu. Until 2000, Pevkur worked as a lawyer.

Political career
From 2000 to 2005, Pevkur worked in the Nõmme City District Government, first as Administrative Secretary and later as Head of City District. From 2005 to 2007, he was on the Tallinn City Council and served as an adviser to the Minister of Justice. From 2007 to 2009, Pevkur was a member of the 11th Riigikogu and also a member of the Nõmme Administrative Council.

On 23 February 2009, Pevkur replaced Maret Maripuu as the Minister of Social Affairs, after Maripuu  decided to step down due to a scandal caused by the Ministry's inability to ensure home delivery of pensions and timely welfare payments.

10 December 2012, Pevkur was appointed as the Minister of Justice.

From 2014 to 2016, Pevkur was the Minister of the Interior in Taavi Rõivas' first and second cabinets.

On 23 October 2017, Pevkur was elected as a deputy speaker of the Riigikogu to replace Taavi Rõivas, who had resigned following a sexual harassment scandal.

On 13 December 2017, Pevkur announced that he would not run for the chairmanship of the Reform Party anymore in January 2018.

Personal life
Hanno Pevkur is married and has two children – a son and a daughter. In addition to his native Estonian, he speaks Russian, English, German and Finnish.

References

External links

|-

|-

1977 births
21st-century Estonian politicians
Estonian Reform Party politicians
Government ministers of Estonia
Living people
Members of the Riigikogu, 2007–2011
Members of the Riigikogu, 2011–2015
Members of the Riigikogu, 2015–2019
Members of the Riigikogu, 2019–2023
Members of the Riigikogu, 2023–2027
Ministers of the Interior of Estonia
People from Alutaguse Parish
University of Tartu alumni